Chainides is a Cretan folk music group who are inspired by
the vast legacy of traditional Cretan music and whose lyrics borrow words
from the Cretan Greek dialect. The group's name is the plural of the word chaínis
(), meaning the fugitive rebel.

History
The group was formed in March 1990 by a group of friends, namely Dimitris Apostolakis, Dimitris Zacharioudakis, Giorgos Laodikis, Miltos Pashalidis and Kallia Spyridaki. Most of
them were then students at the University of Crete. Their discographical debut was in
1991 with the album Chainides that was warmly received by the public. Chainides
rapidly grew to seven members and released three more albums before being temporarily
dissolved in 1997. One year later, Dimitris Apostolakis and Dimitris Zaharioudakis
reinstated the group that was joined by the new members Maria Koti, Alexis Nonis,
Periklis Tsoukalas and Antonis Skamnakis. 

Over the years, Chainides have collaborated with several well-known musicians and singers.
They have performed in several locations both in Greece and abroad and have recorded seven
studio albums. In their live performances, Chainides blend their own compositions and songs
with new arrangements of themes and songs from traditions such as those of Turkey,
Afghanistan and Bulgaria.

Group Members
Dimitris Apostolakis - Cretan lyra, vocals
Dimitris Zaharioudakis - acoustic guitar, vocals
Spyridoula Baka - vocals
Mihalis Nikopoulos - mandolin, bouzouki
Dimitris Brendas - clarinet, gaida bagpipe, kaval flute
Peter Jaques - trumpet, clarinet, ney flute
Takis Kanellos - drums
Giannis Nonis - bass

Discography 
 1991 - Χαΐνηδες (Chainides)
 1993 - Κόσμος κι όνειρο είναι ένα (Kosmos ki oniro ine ena)
 1994 - Με κόντρα τον καιρό (Me kontra ton kero)
 1997 - Το μεγάλο ταξίδι (To megalo taxidi)
 2000 - Ο ξυπόλητος πρίγκηπας (O xipolitos prigipas), double album
 2002 - Δελτίο ειδήσεων (Deltio idiseon), 3 songs
 2005 - Ο γητευτής και το δρακοδόντι (O giteftis kai to drakodonti), double album
 2007 - Ο Καραγκιόζης στη Γιουροβίζιον (O Karagiozis stin Eurovision)
 2008 - Η κάθοδος των Σαλτιμπάγκων (I kathodos ton Saltimpagon)
 2011 - Αγροκτηνοτροφικά και Μητροπολιτικά (Agroktinotrofika & Mitropolitika), double album

Impact
Chainides have treated the Cretan music tradition with love and respect,
considering it as something very much alive rather than a thing of a gone past. 
The group's success is considered to have paved the road for other young artists
to embrace the Cretan music tradition and attempt to enrich it with new elements.

See also
Greek folk music
Cretan music

External links
Chainides official web site
Chainides in mySpace

Folk music groups
Greek musical groups
Greek folk musicians